Sir Patrick Moore (1923–2012) was an English astronomer, co-founder of the Society for Popular Astronomy.

Patrick, Paddy or Pat Moore may also refer to:

Politicians
Patrick J. Moore (1863–1936), American politician, member of the Massachusetts House of Representatives
Pat Moore (politician), American politician, member of the Alabama House of Representatives, 2006–2010

Sportspeople
Patrick Moore (Gaelic footballer) (1867–after 1892), Irish winner of All-Ireland and Munster medals
Paddy Moore (1909–1951), Irish footballer for Shamrock Rovers and Aberdeen
Pat Moore (cricketer) (born 1931), New Zealand player in 1961 and 1966 Test matches
Patrick Moore (golfer) (born 1970), American professional golfer

Writers
Patrick Eisdell Moore (1918–2015), New Zealand surgeon, medical researcher and author
Patrick Moore (consultant) (born 1947), Canadian environmental consultant and former president of Greenpeace Canada
Patrick S. Moore (born 1956), American virologist, epidemiologist and science writer
Patrick Moore (born 1958), English historian and biographer, pen name Philip Hoare

Others
Patrick Theodore Moore (1821–1883), Confederate Army brigadier general in the American Civil War

See also
Patricia Moore (born 1952), American industrial designer, gerontologist and author
Mary-Pat Moore (born 1961), Irish cricketer
Patsy Moore (born 1964), Antigua-born American singer/songwriter, poet, essayist and educator